Martin Etzel (1867 – 1914) was a German trade union leader.

Born in Rothenburg ob der Tauber, Etzel completed an apprenticeship in brewing, and joined the Central Union of Brewery Workers in 1895.  He devoted much of his time to the union, and served on its agitation committee for Northern Bavaria.  In 1899, suffering with poor health, he began working in a hotel, but remained active in the brewery union, working unpaid as its leader in Northern Bavaria from 1900.

In 1904, Etzel began working full-time for the union, based in Hamburg, and in 1907, he was elected as its president.  He was also a leading figure in the formation of the International Secretariat of Brewery Workers, serving as its general secretary.

In 1910, Etzel led the union into a merger which formed the Union of Brewery and Mill Workers.  The new union was dominated by the brewery workers, and Etzel remained its leader.  The union grew significantly, and by 1913, had 51,537 members.

Etzel died in 1914, still in office.

References

1867 births
1914 deaths
German trade union leaders
Rothenburg ob der Tauber
People from Ansbach (district)